Jan Kåre "Hysen" Hystad (born 9 July 1955) is a Norwegian jazz musician (saxophone, clarinet, flute), and the older brother of jazz saxophonist Ole Jacob Hystad. He is known as leader of his own Quartet and as part of the Bergen Big Band with cooperations with Teje Rypdal, John Surman and Karin Krogh.

Career 
Hystad was born in Stord and was classically educated at Griegakademiet, University of Bergen. Since 1978 he has been a resident of Bergen where he has been freelance musician, he led his own ensembles, as well as being involved as Musical Director & Musician at Den Nationale Scene and in Bergen Big Band. Han ga ut Cafè Hysen Noir (2000), with contributions by Guttorm Guttormsen, Harald Dahlstrøm/Håkon Berge/Atle Halstensen piano, Yngve Moe/Sveinung Sand bass, Tarald Tvedten trommer, Erlend Fauske gitar. He conduct his own Jan Kåre Hystad Quartet including Dag Arnesen (piano), Frank Jakobsen (drums) and Sigurd Ulveseth (bass). They released the album Vargtime – Varg Veum's favoritter (2002), which was launched at the same time as Varg Veum's 60 years anniversary, and the publication of the book Som i et speil (2002) by Gunnar Staalesen. The production Vargtime toured thereon Norwegian as well as Danish jazz scenes, "Kongsberg Krimfestival" (2005) and Kongsberg Jazzfestival (2006).  
The follow up Vargtime 2 – four cousins (2006), with musicians Ole Jacob Hystad, Tor Yttredal and Gunnar Onarheim (saxophone), as well as Heidi Torsvik and Oddbjørn Hanto (vocals), was released simultaneously as Staalesen's Dødens drabanter (2006).
Otherwise, he has collaborated on albums with Ole Amund Gjersvik and his broren Ole Jacob Hystad.

The Hystad brothers toured US and Canada with Terje Rypdal's Crime Scene within Bergen Big Band and joined by Rypdal's Skywards, the band. They will wisit the Vancouver Jazz Festival and the Montreal Jazz Festival. The latter ifestival is the world's largest of its kind.

Discography

Solo albums 
2000* Café Hysen Noir (Acoustic Records)

As band leader 
1998: Milonga Triste (Acoustic Records), quartet with Morten Færestrand, Ole Amund Gjersvik & Stein Inge Brækhus
1999: Design by Sound (Acoustic Records), trio with Stein Inge Brækhus & Ole Amund Gjersvik
2002: Vargtime – Varg Veum's favoritter (Gemini Records), as J.K.H. Quartet
2006: Vargtime 2 – Four Cousins (Gemini Records), as J.K.H. Quartet
2009: Vargtime 3 – Something Good (Acoustic Records), as J.K.H. Quartet

Collaborative works 
With Bergen Blues Band
1980: Bergen Blues Band (Harvest, EMI Norge)

With Jan Eggum
1984: Alarmen Går (Karussell)

With Knut Skodvin
1989: Gynt (Gynt), with Harald Dahlstrøm, Ole Thomsen & Tone Ljøkelsøy

With Ole Amund Gjersvik
1990: A Voice from the Past (Acoustic Records)

With Knut Vaage & Ragnvald Vaage
1993: Eg strøyer mine songar ut (Albedo), feat. Linda Øvrebø

With Knut Vaage & Ragnvald Vaage
1994: Jeg – En Beach Boy (Albedo), with Trygve Thue

With Kaizers Orchestra
2001: Ompa Til Du Dør (Acoustic Records)

With Britt-Synnøve Johansen
2002: Mot Himmlen I Paris – Piaf På Norsk (West Audio Production)
2010: Skyt Meg Med Tre Roser – Tango På Norsk (Adelante Records)

Within Bergen Big Band
2003: Adventures in European New Jazz And Improvised Music (Europe Jazz Oddysey), with Mathias Rüegg "Art & Fun" on compilation with various artists
2005: Seagull (Grappa Music), feat. Karin Krog conducted by John Surman recorded at the Nattjazz Festival, Bergen 2004
2007: Meditations on Coltrane (Grappa Music), with The Core
2008: Som den gyldne sol frembryter (Grappa Music)
2010: Crime Scene (ECM Records), with Terje Rypdal recorded at the Nattjazz Festival, Bergen 2009

References 

Norwegian jazz saxophonists
Norwegian jazz composers
Male jazz composers
ECM Records artists
Gemini Records artists
1960 births
Living people
Musicians from Stord
Grieg Academy alumni
21st-century saxophonists
21st-century Norwegian male musicians
Bergen Big Band members